Man It Feels Like Space Again is the sixth album by Australian psychedelic rock band Pond, released on 23 January 2015 in Australia.

Critical reception

Man It Feels Like Space Again received largely positive reviews from contemporary music critics. At Metacritic, which assigns a normalized rating out of 100 to reviews from mainstream critics, the album received an average score of 78, based on 18 reviews, which indicates "generally favorable reviews".

Accolades

Track listing

Personnel
Pond
 Nick Allbrook – mixing, engineering, design, layout; vocals (1, 2, 4, 5, 7, 9), guitar (6), background vocals (8)
 Jay Watson – mixing, engineering, design, layout; drums (1–5, 7, 9), vocals (6), bass guitar (8)
 Joseph Ryan – mixing, engineering, design, layout; vocals (3, 8), guitar (1, 7), background vocals (2, 9), synthesizer programming (4)
 Jamie Terry – mixing, engineering, design, layout; keyboards (1), bass guitar (3), background vocals (8)

Additional personnel
 Rob Grant – mastering
 Kevin Parker – mixing, engineering
 Lukas Glickman – engineering
 Bjenny Montero – artwork, design, layout

Charts

References

2015 albums
Modular Recordings albums
Pond (Australian band) albums
Albums produced by Kevin Parker